Farm House is an American psychological thriller film. The film is directed by George Bessudo and written by Daniel P. Coughlin.

Plot
Scarlet and Chad are a young married couple. Financial troubles and the death of their infant son convince them to move to Seattle, in the hopes of starting a new life. During the drive, Chad falls asleep at the wheel and runs off the road, crashing their vehicle. Although the car itself is destroyed the couple is unharmed. They go to a nearby farmhouse and meet the owner, "Sam" (short for Samael), his wife Lilith, and their deaf handyman helper, Alal. Sam and Lilith let Chad and Scarlet sleep at their house, but during the night Chad and Scarlet are savagely knocked unconscious by Lilith and Sam.

Upon waking, Chad and Scarlet discover that Sam and Lilith intend to torture and kill them. They nearly drown Scarlet in a barrel, but after they leave the room Chad resuscitates her, and the couple tries to flee the farmhouse. Chad is caught by Lilith, but wrestles away a shotgun from her and knocks her unconscious. Scarlet, aided by Alal, runs away into a vineyard field, but is eventually caught by Sam, who kills Alal and takes Scarlet back into the house. While Sam goes to look for Chad, Lilith tortures Scarlet by scraping the flesh off her knees with a grater. Chad interrupts the torture session and kills Lilith by stabbing her in the head with a meat thermometer. Chad tries to set Scarlet free, but is unable to do so before Sam gets back. Chad and Sam fight, and Scarlet stabs Sam in the back with a chef's knife, seriously injuring him. The couple flees in Sam's pickup truck, but Sam revives and pursues them; Chad runs Sam over with the truck several times before they drive off.

After several hours, they begin to wonder why it is not yet morning, and the truck runs out of fuel. Chad and Scarlet set off on foot, only to find themselves mysteriously back at Sam and Lilith's farmhouse. Sam, Lilith, and Alal are all revived and confront them. It is revealed that Chad and Scarlet actually died in the car crash and are now in hell. They meet Satan, who shows them that they are being punished for murdering their son in order to collect a life insurance premium that would be enough to pay back a debt that Chad owed. Scarlet pleads with Satan for a second chance, and she gets it. The film ends with Scarlet looking into the eyes of her infant son.

Cast

See also
 List of thriller films: 2000s
 List of horror films: 2000s

References

External links
 
 

2008 films
2008 horror films
2008 psychological thriller films
Demons in film
American psychological thriller films
Films set on farms
2000s English-language films
2000s American films